Grace Nortey  (born 1 February 1937) is a Ghanaian actress who has played several lead roles on Ghanaian television. She has been active in the film, theatre and drama industry for over five decades and is considered as one of the ace actresses and pioneers of Ghanaian theatre and drama. She has starred in some of the most memorable movie productions released by the National Film and Television Institute (NAFTI). Throughout her long and illustrious career on television, she has gained considerable recognition and admiration as a trailblazer who paved the way for women's active involvement in the performing arts. Grace is recognised as one of the most prominent and versatile Ghanaian female actresses to bring comedy and drama to the masses, particularly in TV programmes such as Akan Drama and TV Theatre. In doing so, she championed the cause of women in a male-dominated society, challenged the asymmetric power relations between the rich and the poor, and lent voice to the disadvantaged and oppressed through resistance and open rejection of discriminatory traditions and unethical practices. She was often typecast as a feisty, vocal, assertive, eloquent, no-nonsense and strong-willed matriarch who confronted outmoded and discriminatory traditions and practices, including the deeply conservative views of the patriarchy, male domination, backward and dehumanising socio-cultural practices against women and girls, class discrimination, institutional corruption, social injustice, among others. One significant attribute of Grace's numerous performances which has won her millions of adoring fans is how she often took on formidable male opponents with unflinching resolve and dogged determination.

Nortey's popularity is largely attributed to numerous onscreen confrontations with unwieldy and intransigent male adversaries, including the likes of Solomon Sampa, MacJordan Amartey, George Williams, Kofi Adjorlolo, William Addo (Akpatse), among others. Some of her most memorable onscreen confrontations involve lengthy, passionate but hilarious verbal altercations with these dominant men, with both sides refusing to back down. Her outstanding performances in these roles as a firm and assertive matriarch who sought justice has earned her a great deal of affection and popular acclaim among viewers and critics alike. Through repeated playing of these stereotypical roles over time, Grace gained a fearsome onscreen reputation as a feisty and vociferous woman who never hesitates to defend her principles and values. Her consistent portrayal of these formidable characters in theatre, film and drama therefore earned her the nickname "Maame Gyata" (Lion Woman/Lion Lady), thus cementing her reputation as a tough woman who is not to be trifled with.

Nortey was particularly active between the 80s and the turn of the millennium  - the period often described as the golden age of Ghanaian theatre and drama when primetime evening entertainment TV programmes such as "Obra", "Osofo Dadzie", "Key Soap Concert Party", "Cantata", "Taxi Driver", "Thursday Theatre", were at the height of their popularity. She had starred in numerous stage productions prior to appearing in film and television. Before gaining fame on television, she hosted a radio talk show for Ga women ("Nyeawokoshie") on Radio One from the 1970s. Her first major appearance on the screen was in a King Ampaw/Peter Wohlgemuth-Reinery co-produced Afro Movies comic film "Juju" in 1986, where she played the wife of fellow veteran actor Joe Eyison, alongside the likes of Emmanuel Agbenowu, Grace Ofoe, Osei Kwabena, Evans Oma Hunter, among others. Since then, she has starred in countless movies, theatre productions and drama series with both of her contemporaries and the new generation of Ghanaian actors. Some of her most notable movies include Lost Hope, Dza Gbele, Matters of the Heart, Sekina, Expectations, Jewels, Beasts of No Nation (2015), Ties That Bind (2011), Sinking Sands (2011), Nana Akoto (1985), Escape to Love (1996), The Other Side of The Rich (1992), among others.

Nortey has worked with several notable actors, writers, directors and producers in the Ghana arts and performances industry. Some of Grace's most notable co-actors and contemporaries in the movie industry include Solomon Sampah (Quench Walahi), Regina Pornortey, Grace Omaboe, George Williams, Monica Quarqopono, MacJordan Amartey, Emmanuel Ceedo, Amanorbea Dodoo, Wiliam Abbey Okai, Joe Eyison (Station Master), Fred Amugi, Kofi Adjorlolo, Agnes Dapaah, Margaret Quainoo, Cecilia Adjei, Paa Kwesi Ackom, Boatemaa Owusu,  Ebo Banson, Araba Kwansema Okyire, Kofi Middleton Mends, George B. Williams, Vera Mensah, Mavis Odonkor, Sussie Okine, Dr Rokoto, Emmanuel Armah, Abeiku Sagoe, Dzifa Glikpoe, among others. Her mentors and role models in the arts and performances industry include Ernest Abbeyquaye, Kofi Mends, Abbey Okine and Glover Akpe. Alongside acting, she was also employed as Senior Administrative Assistant with the Ghana Education Service.

Problems with her physical health and eyesight in recent years means that she no longer takes on highly scripted or physically demanding acting roles due to restrictions with her mobility and the challenges of reading long scripts. Nonetheless, she still performs minor roles in movies and drama which require less physical movement and also provides greater scope for onset improvisation.

Advocacy 
Nortey is a member of the Ghana Actors Guild which seeks to promote the welfare of members past and present. In recent years, Nortey has championed the cause of veteran actors in the film and television industry, focusing on widespread instances of loneliness, poverty and their continued neglect in old age. In particular, she has highlighted the plight of aged, infirm and unemployed actors who are either side-lined for roles or living in destitution because of the lack of proper retirement packages to cater for their upkeep. She has also stressed the need for government agencies, associations and the wider Ghanaian community to recognise the immense contributions and sacrifices of veteran actors to film and television.

In recent years, Nortey has also stressed the need for actors to obtain formal education and educational training in acting before pursuing a full time career in the industry. She's of the view that “acting is a bit easier and lucrative, but it is not something one could do for the rest of her life. Acting is seasoned, for about ten to fifteen years one will still not be the strong person as she used to be”. She has also highlighted the need for female actresses to be mindful of nude scenes and overly exposing themselves onscreen to gain popularity. In her view, its important that female actresses discuss any sensitive roles with their husbands and partners before agreeing to take them on.

Personal life 
Nortey has five children. Grace is the mother of Sheila Nortey who is also an actress.

Filmography

Film

Awards 
Best Cameo Actress (Movie: "Adams Apple") - Ghana Movie Awards (2011)
Excellence in Arts - Glitz Women of the Year Honours (2016)
Lifetime Achievement Award - Black Star International Film Festival (BSIFF) Awards (2018)
Legendary Award for Outstanding Contributions -  Ghana Actors Entertainment Award (GAEA) - (2020)
Outstanding Contribution to Women's Excellence in The Performing Arts - 3Music Awards Women's Brunch (2021)

References 

20th-century Ghanaian actresses
Ghanaian television actresses
Living people
Place of birth missing (living people)
1937 births